Royal Park railway station is located on the Upfield line in Victoria, Australia. It serves the northern Melbourne suburb of Parkville, and it opened on 9 September 1884.

It is located in the park of the same name, and is the nearest station to Melbourne Zoo. A disused signal box is located at the Up end of Platform 1.

History

Royal Park station opened on 9 September 1884, when the railway line was extended from North Melbourne to Coburg. The original plan for the route of the line through Royal Park was to be east of the Zoological Gardens, but after local protests against the destruction of the park, a decision was made to build the line to the west for "reasons of economy". On opening, only temporary station buildings were provided, along with a signal box and gatekeepers cottage.

On 8 May 1888, Royal Park became a junction, with the opening of the Inner Circle line, to both Clifton Hill and Northcote. At the same time, a timber station building and station masters residence were erected. Between 1889 and 1912, there was a goods siding near the station, named Royal Park Cutting Siding.

In 1920, the current station building on Platform 1 opened, after the original station building was destroyed by fire in 1919. It opened with a tile roof in the "Gisborne style" and, in 1936, a new waiting shed and ticket office replaced earlier structures on Platform 2.

In 1971, boom barriers replaced interlocked gates at the Poplar Road level crossing, located at the Up end of the station, when automatic signaling reached the station from Jewell, with automatic signaling extended to Macaulay in 1972. In 1981, the Inner Circle line (by then a goods-only stub to Fitzroy) was closed, and in 1989, the waiting shed on Platform 2 was destroyed by arson. In 1994, the signal box on Platform 1 was closed.

Platforms and services

Royal Park has two side platforms. It is serviced by Metro Trains' Upfield line services.

Platform 1:
  all stations services to Flinders Street

Platform 2:
  all stations services to Upfield

Transport links

Dysons operates one route via Royal Park station, under contract to Public Transport Victoria:
 : Moonee Ponds Junction – Melbourne University

Yarra Trams operates one route via Royal Park station:
 : West Coburg – Toorak

References

External links

 Melway map at street-directory.com.au

Railway stations in Australia opened in 1884
Railway stations in Melbourne
Railway stations in the City of Melbourne (LGA)